The Rockfords is the only full-length studio album by the American rock band The Rockfords. It was released on February 1, 2000 through Epic Records.

Overview
The Rockfords features members of Goodness and Pearl Jam. The album was recorded in 1999 at Studio Litho and John & Stu's Place in Seattle, Washington. Studio Litho is owned by Pearl Jam guitarist Stone Gossard. The band worked with producer John Goodmanson, who also mixed the album. Vocalist/guitarist Nancy Wilson of Heart contributes guest vocals on the track "Riverwide". Theresa E. LaVeck of Allmusic called the album a "compelling, if uneven, collaborative effort."

Track listing

Japanese bonus track

Personnel
The Rockfords
Carrie Akre – vocals
Chris Friel – drums
Rick Friel – bass guitar
Mike McCready – guitar
Danny Newcomb – guitar

Additional musicians and production
Ames Design – package design
Greg Calbi – mastering
John Goodmanson – production, arranging, mixing
Nancy Wilson – vocals on "Riverwide"

References

2000 debut albums
Albums produced by John Goodmanson
Epic Records albums
The Rockfords albums